Bykhaw District (Bykhovsky raion) is a raion (district) in Mogilev Region, Belarus, the administrative center is the town of Bykhaw. As of 2009, its population was 35,148. Population of Bychaw accounts for 48.5% of the district's population.

References

 
Districts of Mogilev Region